Gusher may refer to:

 Blowout (well drilling), the uncontrolled release of crude oil and/or natural gas from a well
 Crush 'n' Gusher, a water coaster in Disney's Typhoon Lagoon on the Walt Disney World Resort property
 Fruit Gushers, a Betty Crocker-branded fruit snack
 Lakeview Gusher, an eruption of hydrocarbons from a pressurized oil well in the Midway-Sunset Oil Field in Kern County, California
 Gusher of Lies, a book by Robert Bryce
 Gusher Marathon, an annual spring marathon held in Beaumont, Texas
 Slush Gusher, a body slide attraction at Disney's Blizzard Beach

See also
 
 
 Gush (disambiguation)